The 2004 Sultan Azlan Shah Cup was the 13th edition of field hockey tournament the Sultan Azlan Shah Cup.

Participating nations
Seven countries participated in the tournament:

Results

Preliminary round

Pool

Fixtures

Classification round

Fifth and sixth place

Third and fourth place

Final

Statistics

Final standings

Goalscorers

References

External links
Official website

2004 in field hockey
2004
2004 in Malaysian sport
2004 in South Korean sport
2004 in Australian sport
2004 in German sport
2004 in Spanish sport
2004 in Pakistani sport 
2004 in Indian sport